Kelly Smith is an English football forward.

Kelly Smith may also refer to:

Kelly Smith (wheelchair racer), Canadian paralympic athlete
Kelly Smith (rugby union) (born 1995), English rugby union player
Kelly R. Smith (born 1946), American politician
Kelly Miller Smith (1920–1984), Baptist preacher, author, and prominent activist in the American Civil Rights Movement
Kelly Preston (1962-2020), née Kelly Smith, actress
Marc Smith (poet) (born 1949), often referred to as Kelly Smith